Kenneth Corn (born October 8, 1976) is a former member of the Oklahoma Senate, representing an electoral district that includes Sequoyah and Le Flore counties. He served as caucus chair for the Democratic caucus in the Oklahoma Senate. He previously served in the Oklahoma House of Representatives from 1998 to 2002 and served as the Democratic caucus secretary. He ran unsuccessfully for Lieutenant Governor of Oklahoma losing to Republican Todd Lamb on November 2, 2010.  He has served as City Manager of Anadarko, Oklahoma since 2015.

Early life
Corn was born October 8, 1976, to Elester and Katy Corn in Poteau, Oklahoma. A Howe High School graduate, he earned his bachelor of arts in 2005 from the University of Oklahoma. Corn served in a number of national civic organizations and on the National School-to-Work Advisory Council for the U.S. departments of education and labor. Corn was the State President of Future Business Leaders of America and served as National President during his senior year in high school. He worked as a legislative intern for James Hamilton, the appropriations chairman of the Oklahoma House of Representatives and former President Pro Tempore of the Oklahoma Senate.

Oklahoma Legislature
Corn served in the Oklahoma House of Representatives from 1998 to 2002. He was 22 at the time of his election and one of the youngest Oklahomans elected to serve in the State House in the state's history.  During his tenure, he was appointed the first freshmen lawmaker in thirty years to serve as vice chair of a major committee, Revenue and Taxation. Corn later served as chair of the committee on Tourism and Recreation.

In 2002, he was elected to the Oklahoma State Senate at the age of 25, making him the second youngest state senator elected in the state's history.
Corn served in the Oklahoma Senate until 2010.  As a Senator, Corn was tapped as Chair of the Retirement and Insurance Committee and served six years on the State Pension Commission.  With these responsibilities, he had oversight over billions of dollars in assets.  Corn was also appointed as Chair of the Senate Approriations Subcommittee on Public Safety and Judiciary.  Historic investments were made to improve law enforcement pay and benefits as well as infrastructure during his committee leadership.

In the Legislature, Corn worked for major changes to the state's retirement system for public employees. He also authored a resolution to put a state question on the ballot that would create an emergency road fund. In addition, in 2004 he was the primary author to the bill that funded health insurance costs for all Oklahoma teachers working in the public schools and authored legislation that raised teacher pay, moving it closer to the regional average.  In 2005, Corn was the principal architect in the Senate for the largest investment in roads and bridges in state history at the time. Oklahoma's Council on Law Enforcement Education and Training was reformed under Senate Bill 920 authored by Corn as well.

Campaign for Lieutenant Governor
Corn announced on January 21, 2009, he would seek the Oklahoma Democratic Party's nomination for Lieutenant Governor of Oklahoma as part of the 2010 state elections. Corn was the only Democrat to file for office and received the Democratic nomination without opposition. On November 2, 2010, Corn lost the election to Todd Lamb, nominee of the Oklahoma Republican Party.

Anadarko City Manager 
Corn was appointed to serve as City Manager of Anadarko, Oklahoma on March 31, 2005.  At the time of his appointment, Anadarko had been operating in a deficit. Corn overhauled the City's purchasing process, billing systems and renegotiated contractual obligations bringing the city back to financial stability and allowing significant investments in capital improvements.

Corn renewed partnerships with the federal, state, county and tribal governments that generated over $2 million in grants awarded to Anadarko and completed large capital improvements for the City, including significant upgrades to City sidewalks, roadways, landscaping, public art, and to Anadarko’s parks.  In addition, by gaining support of industries, local businesses and tribal governments, Corn developed festivals including Hoppy Day, Zombies-in-the-Park, Kites-and-Flights, and a traveling Easter Bunny and Santa, all free to the public.

During his tenure, Anadarko has withstood historic weather, including a “hundred-year flood,” ice storms and record-breaking Arctic temperatures.  During each crisis, Corn became widely acclaimed by Anadarko citizens for working on sight with city crews and updating people via Facebook Live.

State Director for United States Department of Agriculture 
On February 24, 2022 Corn was appointed to serve as the United States Department of Agriculture (USDA) State Director for Rural Development in Oklahoma by President Joseph Biden, Jr.

Personal life
Corn is an Eagle Scout and a member of the National Association of Eagle Scouts. Corn also is a member of the American Council of Young Political Leaders where he has represented the United States on exchanges to Vietnam and the Euro-Asia Conference on Democracy.

He has worked as an adjunct professor with Carl Albert State College.

References

External links
Senator Kenneth Corn - District 4 official State Senate website
Project Vote Smart - Kenneth Corn (OK) profile
Follow the Money - Kenneth Corn
2008 2006 2004 2002 State Senate campaign contributions
2000 State House campaign contributions

1976 births
Living people
People from Poteau, Oklahoma
University of Oklahoma alumni
Democratic Party members of the Oklahoma House of Representatives
Democratic Party Oklahoma state senators
21st-century American politicians
Candidates in the 2010 United States elections